Egidio Alagna (31 October 1935 – 3 May 2022) was an Italian politician. A member of the Italian Socialist Party, he served in the Chamber of Deputies from 1983 to 1992. He died in Palermo on 3 May 2022 at the age of 86.

References

1935 births
2022 deaths
20th-century Italian judges
Deputies of Legislature IX of Italy
Deputies of Legislature X of Italy
Italian Socialist Party politicians
People from Marsala